The 2016 Jubilee Trophy is the national championship for women's soccer clubs in Canada.  It was held in St. John's, Newfoundland from October 5–10, 2016.

Teams 
Ten teams were granted entry into the competition; one from each Canadian province excluding Prince Edward Island. As host, Newfoundland and Labrador was permitted a second entry into the competition. This represents an increase of two teams from the eight sides that contested the 2015 Jubilee Trophy.

Teams are selected by their provincial soccer associations; most often qualifying by winning provincial leagues or cup championships such as the Ontario Cup.

Group stage
The ten teams in the competition are divided into two groups of five teams each, which then play a single-game round-robin format.  At the end of group play, each team faces the equal-ranked team from the other group to determine a final seeding for the tournament.

Group A

Group B

Final round
The final round consists of one game for each club, where they are paired with their equal-ranked opponent from the opposite group to determine a final ranking for the tournament.

Tournament ranking

References

External links 
 Canadian Soccer Association National Championships

Jubilee